Mikhail Yuryevich Malofeyev (March 25, 1956 – January 18, 2000) was a Russian Major general who went missing in Grozny, Chechnya in January 2000, amidst conflicting reports, including claims of his capture. His body was later found in the city. He was posthumously awarded the title Hero of Russia.

References

External links
A Top General in Chechnya Is Missing After Battle
Moscow 'loses' top general in Grozny assault
Russian soldiers, dogs hunt for missing general

1956 births
2000 deaths
Deaths by firearm in Russia
People of the Chechen wars
Russian major generals
Heroes of the Russian Federation
Russian military personnel killed in action
Burials at Nikolskoe Cemetery
Frunze Military Academy alumni
Military personnel missing in action